Abdulrab is both a surname and a given name. Notable people with the name include:

Muamer Abdulrab (1982–2021), Qatari footballer
Abdulrab Muhammad Muhammad Ali al-Sayfi, Yemeni fugitive
Habib Abdulrab Sarori (born 1956), Yemeni computer scientist and writer